KWLV (107.1 FM) is a radio station broadcasting a country music format. Licensed to Many, Louisiana, United States, the station serves  Sabine Parish and surrounding areas from a studio located in Many, Louisiana.  The station is currently owned by Baldridge-Dumas Communications, Inc . The station broadcasts using the Westwood One Mainstream Country format.

History
According to the station's website, the station was started in November 1978.

References

External links

Radio stations in Louisiana
Country radio stations in the United States
Sabine Parish, Louisiana
Radio stations established in 1978